Brown Knoll is one of the highest hills in the Peak District in central England.

Description 
Brown Knoll is a treeless, domed summit covered in moorland vegetation. A track between the Pennine Way and Pennine Bridleway runs past the summit to the northwest and a footpath branches off from that track crosses the summit itself and heads southeast to the hills lining the southern side of the valley of Edale. The area is designated Open Access land, but is outside the National Trust's High Peak Estate.

References 

Mountains and hills of the Peak District
Mountains and hills of Derbyshire
Moorlands of England